Muharrem Jashari (born 21 February 1998) is a Kosovan footballer who plays as a midfielder for Kosovan club Drita and the Kosovo national team.

Club career

Drita
On 16 June 2021, Jashari signed a three-year contract with Football Superleague of Kosovo club Drita, and receiving squad number 10. Drita reportedly paid a €80 thousand transfer fee. On 8 July 2021, he made his debut with Drita in the 2021–22 UEFA Europa Conference League first qualifying round against the Montenegrin side Dečić after being named in the starting line-up.

International career
On 31 May 2021, Jashari received a call-up from Kosovo for the friendly matches against Guinea and Gambia. Eight days later, he made his debut with Kosovo in a friendly match against Guinea after coming on as a substitute at 76th minute in place of Rron Broja.

References

External links

1998 births
Living people
Sportspeople from Mitrovica, Kosovo
Kosovan footballers
Kosovo under-21 international footballers
Kosovo international footballers
Association football midfielders
Football Superleague of Kosovo players
KF Trepça '89 players
FC Drita players